Pterolophia instabilis is a species of beetle in the family Cerambycidae. It was described by Per Olof Christopher Aurivillius in 1922. It is known from Seychelles.

Varietas
 Pterolophia instabilis var. suturalis Aurivillius, 1922
 Pterolophia instabilis var. unicolor Aurivillius, 1922
 Pterolophia instabilis var. minuscula Aurivillius, 1922
 Pterolophia instabilis var. nigrovittata Aurivillius, 1922
 Pterolophia instabilis var. abscissa Aurivillius, 1922
 Pterolophia instabilis var. transversa Aurivillius, 1922

References

instabilis
Beetles described in 1922